Coelogyne fuscescens is a species of orchid. It is found in Nepal, India, Sikkim, Bhutan, lower Myanmar, China and northeastern Thailand.

References

External links

fuscescens